Karim Tarek Mohamed Safwat (Arabic: كريم طارق محمد صفوت; born 23 January 1992) is an Egyptian professional footballer who plays for Egyptian Premier League club ENPPI and the Egypt national team. Operating mainly as a winger but also as an attacking midfielder, he is a ambidextrous player.

International career 
Tarek made his debut for Egypt in a 1–0 friendly win over Liberia on 7 November 2019.

References

External links 
 
 

1992 births
Living people
Sportspeople from Alexandria
Association football wingers
Association football midfielders
ENPPI SC players
El Gouna FC players
Petrojet SC players
Tala'ea El Gaish SC players
Egyptian Premier League players
Egypt youth international footballers
Egypt under-20 international footballers
Egypt international footballers
Egyptian footballers